Tamares Real Estate Investments is a global, privately owned real estate investment company based in London. It is a subsidiary of Tamares Group, headed by Poju Zabludowicz.

Information
Tamares is the largest landholder in downtown Las Vegas, owning 40% of the land. Tamares acquires and operates its properties.

Today, Tamares Group holds a $3 billion portfolio. Its real estate holdings encompass 2.3 million square feet of office space.

Selected Properties
Currently, Tamares owns the following real estate properties:

41 Dover Street
1500 Broadway
Plaza America
45 Wittener Street, Bochum, Germany
66 St. John Street, London, England
25-11 38th Avenue, Long Island City, NY
Plaza Hotel & Casino
Daniel Herzliya Hotel
Shizen Spa Herzliya
Shizen Spa Dead Sea
West Lagoon Resort Netanya
7950 Jones Branch Drive

Past holdings
Argyle House - sold in December 2002
1-6 Lombard Street - sold in September 2005
Princes House - sold in October 2005 for around £120 million
The Tides Hotel - sold in February 2006
The Gold Spike - sold in July 2007 for $15.6 million
The Western - sold in March 2013 for $14 million
Las Vegas Club - sold in August 2015 for $40 million
Daniel Dead Sea Hotel, West All Suite Tel Aviv and West All Suite Ashdod - sold in November 2020 for NIS155 million

References

External links
Official Website
Real Estate Expert
Tamares on Businessweek

Real estate companies of the United States
Property companies of the United Kingdom